The Big Chance is a 1934 German musical comedy film directed by Victor Janson and starring Hansi Niese, Hans Söhnker and Jakob Tiedtke. It is part of the tradition of operetta films.

The film's sets were designed by the art directors Robert A. Dietrich and Bruno Lutz.

Cast
Hansi Niese as Lenchen Menzel
Hans Söhnker as Thomas, his son
Jakob Tiedtke as Oskar Borke, retired border guard
Walter Steinbeck as Ullmann, general manager
Camilla Horn as Helga, their daughter
Trude Hesterberg as Renate Rodenbeck
Hubert von Meyerinck as Georg, ihr Sohn
Alfred Haase as Max Wellhagen, employee at Ullmann-Werke
Werner Schott as Hans Raschdorf, chief engineer
Paul Henckels as Otto Meckeritz, office manager
Hans Nerking as C.P. Engelmann, Frackverleiher

References

Bibliography

External links

1934 musical comedy films
German musical comedy films
Films of Nazi Germany
Films directed by Victor Janson
Terra Film films
Operetta films
German black-and-white films
1930s German films